Bakhtiar, Bakhtiyar, Bextiyar and other similar transliterations may refer to:

 Bakhtiar (name)
 Title character of the Bakhtiyar-nama
 Bakhtiar (film), a 1955 Soviet comedy film
 Bakhtiar, Alborz, Iran
 Bakhteyar, Fars, Iran
 Bakhtiar, Bagh-e Malek, Khuzestan Province, Iran
 Bakhtiar, Izeh, Khuzestan Province, Iran
 Bakhtiar, Razavi Khorasan, Iran

See also
 Bakhtiari (disambiguation)
 Bakhtiyarli, a ghost village in Qubadli Rayon, Azerbaijan